Green-Eyed Monster may refer to jealousy, a phrase possibly coined by Shakespeare in Othello (Act III, scene 3, line 196).

Green-Eyed Monster may also refer to:

TV episodes 
 "Green-Eyed Monster" (Veronica Mars), episode four of season two of Veronica Mars
 "The Green-Eyed Monster" (Hercules: The Legendary Journeys)
 "Green-eyed Monster", episode of Cannonball (1958)
 "Green-Eyed Monster, season 3, episode 12 from The Facts of Life (1982)
 "The Green Eyed Monster", episode 127, series 9 of The Bill (1993)
 "The Green Eyed Monster", episode 15 of Masked Rider (1996)
 "The Green Eyed Monster", series 2 episode of The Thin Blue Line (1996)
 "Green-Eyed Monster", episode 15 of Ghost Stories (1998)
 "Cocoon Gables / Green-Eyed Monster", 1998 episode of Pepper Ann
 "Green Eyed Monster" (Farscape episode), episode 52-308 of Farscape (2001)
 "The Green-Eyed Monster", series 2 episode of All About Me (2003)
 "Green Eyed Monster", episode 6 of Sabrina's Secret Life (2003)
 "The Green-Eyed Monster", episode 6 of First Class (2008)
 "The Green-Eyed Monster", episode 119 of The Dooley and Pals Show

Music 
 The Green-eyed Monster (or How to Get Your Money), operatic farce by Thomas Welsh (1811)
 The Green-eyed Monster, musical comedy by James Planché (1828)
 "Green Eyed Monster", track #7 on ...Meanwhile by 10cc (1992)
 "Green Eyed Monster", track #4 on Pesto by Less Than Jake (1999)
 "Green Eyed Monster", track #2 on On My Own by Suzi Rawn (2002)
 "Green Eyed Monster", De/Vision single
 "Green-Eyed Monster", track #11 on Beautiful Seed by Corrinne May (2007)

Other 
 The Green-Eyed Monster (1916 film), a lost silent film drama
 The Green Eyed Monster (1919 film)
 The Green-Eyed Monster (2001 film), a two-part British television crime drama film
 "The Green Eyed Monster", a short story featuring Augustus S. F. X. Van Dusen
 The Green-Eyed Monster, 1970–71 storyline in Modesty Blaise
 Incredible Hulk (cocktail), also called Green Eyed Monster
 "The Green Eyed Monster", an episode of CBS Radio Mystery Theatre adapted from the play Othello by Shakespeare
 The Green Eyed Monster,  a nickname for the Helmet-mounted display unit found on the US Army's AH-64 attack helicopter
 The butterfly Nepheronia buquetii,  also called the green-eyed monster

See also
 The Berenstain Bears and the Green Eyed Monster
 Green Monster (disambiguation)
 "Green Eyed Monster Girl", a track on High on You by Sly & the Family Stone